The , is an  or  (painted narrative handscroll) from the 13th century, in the  period of Japanese history (1185–1333). An illuminated manuscript, it presents nine equestrian portraits of Imperial Guards, painted according to the  technique.

Background
 
Originating in Japan in the sixth or seventh century through trade with the Chinese Empire,  art spread widely among the aristocracy in the Heian period. An  consists of one or more long scrolls of paper narrating a story through  texts and paintings.

The Kamakura period (1185–1333), the advent of which followed a period of political turmoil and civil wars, was marked by the coming to power of the warrior class (the ).

Description

This period difference is faithfully transcribed in the equipment and clothing of the guards.

Dating and author

An inscription located ahead of the fourth guard mentions the month of October 1247, and the  could therefore have been created during or close to that month.

However, there is no certainty about these attributions; as the lines vary through the portraits, the work could have been carried out by several artists, or by one artist using changes of style.

Style
The portraits in the work are perfectly representative of works created at the end of the 12th century according to the  technique, a current of the  painting style that can be defined as the art of realistic portraits of the  period.  was part of the search for realism in painting initiated at that time, in opposition to older pictorial movements under which the faces were stylised or idealised, without a search for authenticity.

The rendering of the nine portraits is based mainly on thin black lines drawn in India ink, the colour being limited to discreet touches for the faces and harnesses of the horses. The pictorial technique is therefore linked to the  tradition popular during the  period: monochrome drawing in ink on plain paper.

Execution, however, varies within the series. The first three portraits show guards from the second half of the 12th century: the lines are very free and expressive, without much recourse to preparatory sketches. As these guards belonged to an older era, it is possible that their portraits were copied from an older scroll. The next four guards (from the fourth to the seventh in the scroll) have a relatively similar stroke, but are based on an initial sketch with fine lines that was then supplemented by thicker brush strokes. In addition, the details of the faces, and especially the nostrils, in these four portraits are more marked than in the first three. The last two portraits are distinguished by the more vigorous use of the brush, as well as a more restrained line scrupulously following the preparatory lines, giving an impression of lower quality. Despite their stylistic differences, all portraits also share recurring elements, including the individuality of the faces, the naturalistic rendering of the horses and the extensive use of fine lines.

Provenance

The history of the scroll remains largely unknown until the 17th century. An entry in the  reveals that in 1731, it was in possession of the Tokugawa clan, then the ruling dynasty of Japan. In 1953, the work was classified as a National Treasure of Japan. It is now held by the Okura Museum of Art in Tokyo.

See also
List of National Treasures of Japan (paintings)

References

Notes

Bibliography

External links

Emakimono
National Treasures of Japan